The River Findhorn (Scottish Gaelic: Uisge Fionn Èireann) is one of the longest rivers in Scotland. Located in the north east, it flows into the Moray Firth on the north coast. It has one of the largest non-firth estuaries in Scotland.

The river is c. long and the catchment area is 

The river provides excellent salmon and trout fishing and is popular with anglers from around the globe. It is also one of Scotland's classic white water kayaking rivers (varying from grade 2 to 4) and draws canoeists from across the country.

Course
The Findhorn rises in the Coignafearn Forest north of the main massif of the Monadhliath Mountains, several streams joining together near the Dalbeg bothy to form it. The westernmost of these is the River Eskin which flows down through a small valley surrounded by the heights of Càrn a' Choire Sheilich , Càrn nan Làraiche Maoile  and Càrn na Saobhaidh . To the south west the Abhainn Cro-chlach takes a direct route along a narrow and steep-sided defile that carries its waters from Carn Odhar na Criche  and Càrn Bàn . The two join by a small bridge in the heart of the Coignafearn Forest (which is a Scottish deer forest and devoid of trees). Strath Dearn descends from here in a southwesterly direction until the river reaches its outlet to the Moray Firth. 

In its upper reaches the river is unusually sinuous, being an incised meandering river valley very little altered by glaciers. The next tributary to join the flow is the Elrick Burn, a substantial rivulet whose head waters are in the Monadhliaths east of the Abhainn Cro-chlach. Its confluence with the Findhorn is just south of the Coignafearn Lodge.  further east is the first wooded area of the valley, on the left bank below Creag Irealis and just upstream from Coignafearn Old Lodge.

The Glenmazaran Burn is the next tributary on the right bank, and various farms and lodges provide habitation from here throughout most of the river's remaining length. Tomatin is the first settlement of any size on the river's banks and here the waters pass under both the Highland Main Line railway and the A9 road. Just beyond this the Allt Bruachaig tumbles down from the heights of the Slochd Mor and joins the Findhorn on its right bank. Here the river takes its only major bend, a lazy S-shape over a  stretch at the end of which the Funtack Burn, which drains Loch Moy to the north, joins the Findhorn's left bank. Beyond this point the character of the landscape changes again as the river enters the Streens gorge.

At Drynachan lodge the valley reverts to its earlier wooded and inhabited character and roads again follow its course almost all the way to the sea. The river is joined by the Carnoch Burn and flows almost due east from here, passing the  contour, and then shortly afterwards it is met by the Tor Burn on the right bank. There is a small, wooded river island in the Findhorn at the point at which it is joined by the Tor Burn - one of the few such islands along its length, none of which are named by the Ordnance Survey. Next, the river reaches the remains of the hillfort of Dunearn just south of Dulsie Bridge. Here the Findhorn turns northwards and flows through a sinuous and narrow gorge with Glenferness House on the right bank and the Ardclach bell tower on the left, after which it reverts to a generally north-westerly course once it passes under the A939 bridge.

Beyond Relugas the Findhorn is joined by the River Divie at the beauty spot of Randolph's Leap. The Divie's head waters lie in the hills to the south of the prominent Knock of Braemoray, and shortly before its confluence with the Findhorn it is itself joined by the Dorback Burn, which is fed by Lochindorb. Hereafter the waters provide kayaking opportunities for the experienced for the next  

Further downstream the Findhorn passes Logie House, the ruined hill fort of Dun Earn, Sluie Walk where it crosses the  contour, the Altyre estate and the Meads of St John before reaching the hamlet of Mundole just outside the town of Forres, which is by far the largest settlement on the river's route. Passing under the Findhorn Bridge on the A96 and the main Inverness to Aberdeen railway line the river finally reaches relatively flat land just  before it reaches Findhorn Bay. This is a large tidal basin and at low water the river is joined by the Muckle, Mosset and Kinloss Burns as it flows unimpeded over its sands. The combined streams flow on to the north with the village and military base of Kinloss to the right, crossing the bay and passing Findhorn Ecovillage and the harbour of the village of Findhorn before exiting the bay through a narrow, sandy channel and entering the Moray Firth with the Culbin Forest on the left. At higher stages of the tide the riverine waters mix with the incoming sea, creating a brackish lagoon.

Etymology

The derivation of the name 'Findhorn' is not absolutely clear. Watson (1926) states that it is derived from Gaelic Fionn Èire, meaning "white Ireland" which  "doubtless refers to the white sands of the estuary". The genitive Èireann then gave rise to the use of the anglicized 'earn' or 'erne' in other local names such as Invererne and Dunearn.

'Burn' is a Scots language word for stream although most of the names referred to above are of Gaelic origin. Other common tributary names include abhainn (river or stream) and allt (brook, burn or stream).

Monadhliath is Am Monadh Liath in Gaelic and means grey mountain range and Càrn means a cairn or heap of stones. Coignafearn is from Cóig na Feàrna and means "the fifth of the alder", in this case "fifth" referring to a fraction of a davoch, a land measurement that could be subdivided into halves, quarters or fifths. Amongst the main settlements Tomatin is from Tom Aitinn meaning "juniper hillock", Forres is from farrais, a small copse  and Kinloss from cinn lois, herb headland.

Geology and geomorphology

During the Caledonian orogeny, some 500 mya, much of the land that is now northern Scotland was subject to folding and metamorphosis and then intruded with granite magma which contributed to the uplift of the area and ultimately the creation of the Grampian mountains of which the Monadliaths that form the head waters of the river Findhorn are a part. The bedrock of the upper Findhorn is largely made up of the Grampian Division of the Moine Supergroup, a formation that stretched from south of Forres to Lochindorb and beyond. These rocks are typically metamorphosed sediments of sandstone that are rich in quartz mixed with some shale and mudstone that date from circa 750 mya.  The schists that underlay the Streens in the middle reaches of the Findhorn were once thought to be part of the younger Dalriadan Supergroup but are now considered to be Moinian as well. The Grampian Slide is a zone of shearing between the younger Grampian Division and the older Central Highland Division.

In the lower Findhorn the bedrock is Old Red Sandstone that was deposited after the Caledonian orogeny. The rapid uplift of the mountain terrain to the south was accompanied by similarly rapid river erosion that resulted in sediment being spread throughout the Moray Firth basin and further north to Orkney and Shetland some 360–400 mya. At this time the land lay some 20 degrees south of the equator and experienced a semi-arid climate.

During the Tertiary period some 65–50 mya volcanic activity on what is now the west coast of Scotland resulted in considerable uplift there and the creation of the slope that dips in an easterly direction that the modern Findhorn river follows.

With the onset of Pleistocene glacial period some 2 mya the whole of northern Scotland became ice-bound. The melting of the ice, which occurred comparatively rapidly, resulted in "vast volumes of meltwater" creating further erosional and depositional features, such as river terraces in the middle reaches of the Findhorn and moraines such as the Cluny hills downstream. 

The great weight of the ice depressed the land surface and with the end of the glacial period there resulted both sea level rises and isostatic rebound of the land which combined with periodic uplifts resulted in a complex interplay of land and sea with a prominent raised shoreline between Nairn and Forres that skirts the Culbin Forest.

However, the shores have not been static even in historic times. The earliest detailed map of the Findhorn estuary dates from 1590 and was made by Timothy Pont. It shows a long sand bar stretching west from the site of the village of Findhorn along the Culbin shore.

Iron Age settlement

Dunearn (near Dulsie Bridge), Doune of Relugas, Dun Earn (by Conicavel) and Cluny Hill in Forres are all Iron Age hillforts.

Rodney's Stone is a Pictish cross slab symbol stone in the grounds of Brodie Castle that was discovered in the Dyke churchyard in 1781.

Medieval period

Sueno's Stone is a Picto-Scottish Class III standing stone on the north-easterly edge of Forres.

Forres Castle stood on the east bank of the Mosset Burn. It may have been the place where King Dub was murdered in 966. Forres was a Royal Burgh from an unknown early date – the original charter having been lost and then renewed in 1496. Kinloss Abbey was founded in 1150 under the rule of the Cistercian order but only ruins now remain, Alexander Brodie of Lethen having reduced it for its stones in 1651.

In 1303 Edward I of England stayed at Lochindorb castle for a month during his military occupation of Scotland. Originally built by the Comyns, the structure sat on an island in the loch. Perhaps the most notorious resident of the Findhorn valley was Alexander Stewart, the Wolf of Badenoch, who was based at the castle and who burned Forres, Pluscarden Abbey and Elgin in 1390. In 1455 it was reduced by the Thane of Cawdor on the orders of James II and only the outer walls now remain.

Modern era

Various places are claimed to have been where the last wolf in Scotland was slain. One such story is that of a deer stalker called MacQueen who shot one on Clan Mackintosh land in the Findhorn valley in 1743. In the wake of the 1745 Jacobite rebellion the French brigantine Le Bien Trouvé slipped past a British blockade in March 1746 into Findhorn Bay. The bay was too shallow for larger British frigates and sloops and although  opened fire no damage was caused. On the night of 6 April the Frenchman slipped out again carrying Bonnie Prince Charlie's aide-de-camp Richard Warren and escaped safely to Dunkirk.

The Findhorn valley was badly affected by the Highland Clearances "which had a tragic impact not only upon remote glens but also upon the Moray Firth as a whole. From it arose the lamentations of a whole people... They had been taught to see themselves as the descendants of 'conquerors' who had won an inalienable right to the land in which they were settled. To them the rebuke of the Canadian Boat Song was well merited".

If the clearances were a man-made travail, the Muckle Spate of 1829 was a natural disaster unparalleled in the historic record of the Findhorn. On 3 August of that year heavy rain in the Cairngorms resulted in flooding in the catchment of several rivers in north-east Scotland and that of the Findhorn has been described as "the most severe catastrophic flood in modern UK history". Based on the eyewitness accounts recorded by Sir Thomas Dick Lauder (who was also the author of a romantic history about the life of the "Wolf of Badenoch") were able to determine peak flows down the main river of up to 1,484 m3/s and 451 m3/s on the Divie. Lauder describes numerous incidents including the daring rescues of those trapped by the floods on the plain of Forres by fishermen from Findhorn village. It is at Randolph's Leap that the Findhorn river is at its most spectacular in spate.

During the early 21st century Moray Council undertook a flood prevention scheme on the Mosset Burn to protect the town of Forres up to a standard of a 1 in 100 years event. The principle component of the project is a 3.8 million m3 flood storage reservoir at Chapelton to the south of the town.

Notable buildings
The Findhorn valley has a wide variety of listed buildings, several of which are the main residence of Highland estates.  These include Dunphail House, on the River Divie, built on the site of a 14th-century castle, the white harled and crowstepped Logie House near Randolph's Leap, Darnaway Castle with its 15th-century Earl Randolph's Hall, described as "unique in non-Royal castles" and Altyre, which has a 19th-century Italianate farm steading, "  now used by Glasgow School of Art. Brodie Castle, which lies to the west in the vale of the Muckle Burn, has large formal gardens and was visited by Robert Burns in 1787.

In Forres the Tolbooth on the High Street is to an 1838 design with a 3-staged tower and cupola based on the c.1700 version (itself an addition to the original). Cluny Hill College, originally a hydropathic hotel dates to 1863 and "has a rambling skyline of  dutch gables, ordinary gables, chimneys, parapets and bays". The octagonal Nelson's Tower on the summit of the nearby Cluny Hills is a prominent landmark that was erected in 1806 to celebrate Nelson’s victory at Trafalgar.

The Universal Hall is an arts and conference centre at Findhorn Ecovillage that enjoys a stained glass window by American artist James Hubbel. At the heart of the village of Findhorn are the 1739 Crown and Anchor Inn and Findhorn House, the home of the Royal Findhorn Yacht Club, which is an 18th-century house with late 19th-century enlargements.

Ecology and leisure
Agriculture and forestry are practiced throughout the length of the land on the Findhorn's banks, but leisure activities are also an important aspect of the river and its catchment. On the high moors which are the source of the headwaters, red deer and grouse shooting are significant activities. Hill walking and bird watching are also important aspects of local tourism. Here, hardy plant species such as heather and Juniper thrive on the peaty soils and in the sheltered valley there are stands of Scots pine.

See also
 Fauna of Scotland
 Flora of Scotland

The neighbouring:
 River Nairn to the west
 River Spey to the east.

References

Notes

Citations

Bibliography

Further reading
 

Findhorn
Findhorn
0Findhorn